Greyfriars, Grayfriars or Gray Friars is a term for Franciscan Order of Friars Minor, in particular, the Conventual Franciscans. The term often refers to buildings or districts formerly associated with the order.

Former Friaries
 Greyfriars, Bedford
 Greyfriars, Beverley, Yorkshire, England
 Greyfriars, Bristol
 Greyfriars, Canterbury, earliest English Franciscan friary
 Greyfriars, Coventry
 Greyfriars, Dorchester
 Greyfriars, Dunwich, dissolved in 1538 some ruins remain as a Scheduled Ancient Monument
 Greyfriars, Gloucester, the ruins of a monastery, also a street named after the same
 Greyfriars, Ipswich, founded before 1236, virtually nothing remains
 Greyfriars, King's Lynn, the tower survives and is a prominent local landmark
 Greyfriars, Lincoln, former Franciscan friary; only the infirmary now survives
 Greyfriars, Leicester, original burial place of Richard III of England
 Greyfriars, London
 GreyFriars, Newcastle-upon-Tyne, founded 1327, dissolved 1539; rebuilt as private residence, demolished 1832
 Greyfriars, Nottingham, founded 1224–1230, dissolved in 1539; nothing remains of the friary
 Greyfriars, Perth
 Greyfriars, Richmond
 Greyfriars, Shrewsbury
 Greyfriars, St Andrews, Fife, Scotland
 Greyfriars, Stamford
 Greyfriars, Winchelsea
 Greyfriars, Worcester
 Greyfriars Monastery, Stockholm

Churches
 Christ Church Greyfriars, in London
 Greyfriars Church, Reading
 Greyfriars Kirk, Edinburgh

Other
 Grey Friars F.C., former football club, c.1870-1880
 Greyfriars, Bristol (office block)
 Greyfriars Bobby, a renowned Edinburgh dog
 Greyfriars bus station, former bus station in Northampton
 Greyfriars Kirkyard, a graveyard in Edinburgh
 Greyfriars, Oxford, a former Permanent Private Hall of the University of Oxford
 Greyfriars, Preston, an electoral ward in Lancashire
 Greyfriars, Worcester, a Grade I listed building in Worcester, England

In fiction
 Greyfriars School, a fictional school which is the setting for Frank Richard's Billy Bunter stories